Gary Rizzo (born January 31, 1972) is an American re-recording mixer. He studied audio engineering at Full Sail University and works at Lucasfilm's Skywalker Sound. He has won two Oscars for Best Sound and has been nominated for another three in the same category. He has worked on more than 200 films since 1994.

Selected filmography
Rizzo has won two Academy Awards and has been nominated for another three:

Won
 Inception (2010)
 Dunkirk (2017)

Nominated
 The Incredibles (2004)
 The Dark Knight (2008)
 Interstellar (2014)

References

External links

1972 births
Living people
American audio engineers
Best Sound Mixing Academy Award winners
Best Sound BAFTA Award winners
People from New Jersey
Full Sail University alumni
Lucasfilm people